Marcus Klausmann (born 8 August 1977) is a German former downhill mountain biker. He notably finished second overall at the 1996 UCI Downhill World Cup and won the second race in Nevegal, Italy. He also won the National Downhill Championships thirteen times: in 1997, 1998, 1999, 2000, 2002, 2003, 2004, 2005, 2006, 2007, 2009, 2010 and 2013.

References

External links

Living people
Downhill mountain bikers
1977 births
German male cyclists
People from Albstadt
Sportspeople from Tübingen (region)
German mountain bikers
Cyclists from Baden-Württemberg